Dupax del Norte, officially the Municipality of Dupax del Norte, is a 3rd class municipality in the province of Nueva Vizcaya, Philippines. According to the 2020 census, it has a population of 33,295 people.
Dupax del Norte, situated on the south-eastern part of Nueva Vizcaya, has a total land area of 396 square kilometers. It is bounded by the town of Kasibu in the north, Alfonso Castañeda in the east, Dupax del Sur in the south, and Bambang in the west. It has wide tracts of virgin forests, rich, fertile plains and valleys with mineral deposits and is blessed with a climate suitable for agriculture.

Etymology
The name "Dupax" comes from the Isinay word "dopaj". By "dopaj" the Isinays, who are the first inhabitants of Dupax, meant "to lie down in complete relaxation."

History
According to folklores that have survived from generation to generation, even long before the founding fathers established the municipality, the site of what eventually became the "poblacion", or town proper of Dupax, used to serve as a roaring camp for primitive hunters from surrounding tribal settlements. After hard days of hunting in nearby mountains, the hunters would repair the camp where they would feast on their catch of wild animals. When they were through with their brand of merrymaking "they would lie down and relax completely" before getting up again to return to their respectives home. The camping area, which was a plain or a valley, was near their hunting grounds that later, they decided to settle on it together with their families and the town of Dopaj was established.

In time, the town's name metamorphosed into Dupax, after the arrival of the Spaniards who, for convenience, substituted the letter "x" in lieu of letter "j" for easy pronunciation.

The original town of Dupax is the largest municipality of the province of Nueva Vizcaya in terms of land area. But in 1971, the Congress passed into law Republic Act 6372 otherwise known as "An Act Creating the Municipality of Dupax del Sur from the Municipality of Dupax in the province of Nueva Vizcaya", sponsored by Congressman Benjamin B. Perez in the Philippine House of Representatives and Senator Leonardo B. Perez in the Philippine Senate. president Ferdinand Marcos amended some sections and signed it into law with the promulgation of Presidential Decree 586 on November 26, 1974, which paved the way for the division of Dupax into two municipalities: Dupax del Norte and Dupax del Sur.

As early as 1928, during the term of Municipal President Inocencio Suzon, there were already attempts to transfer the town hall to Barangay Malasin (poblacion of the present Dupax del Norte) from the poblacion (the present poblacion of Dupax del Sur). On November 28, 1931, during the incumbency of Municipal President Tranquilino Orden, the Municipal Council has approved Resolution No. 94 sponsored by Councilor Victoriano Barroga proposing the transfer of the seat of the municipal government from the old poblacion to Malasin. However, it was only in 1956 that the move has succeeded when Congress approved Republic Act 1181 sponsored by Congressman Leonardo B. Perez.

Geography
Dupax del Norte is located 190.41 kilometers north of Manila and 20.08 kilometers south of Bayombong.

Barangays

Dupax del Norte is politically subdivided into 15 barangays. These barangays are headed by elected officials: Barangay Captain, Barangay Council, whose members are called Barangay Councilors. All are elected every three years.

Mabasa
Mabasa (Iloko for "wet") is a barangay of Dupax del Norte in the province of Nueva Vizcaya, Philippines. It was one of the oldest barrio of Dupax (when the town was not yet divided into two, Dupax del Norte and Dupax del Sur). Mabasa was originally called San Roque, named by the parish priest of Dupax after the saint of hunters because the place then was a thick forest where game was abundant such as deer and wild pigs.

The first settlers of San Roque were Ilokano migrants from the town of Paoay in Ilocos Norte and from Alcala and San Nicolas towns in Pangasinan. They travelled by foot and by horses and carabaos through San Nicolas, Pangasinan, passing through Imugan, Santa Fe, Nueva Vizcaya because that was the shortest way possible during those times. The migrants settled at Sitio Poonan (later called Puongan). The family of Apolonio Vadil was the first settler in Poungan. Old records from the Roman Catholic Church in Dupax del Sur showed that the daughter of Apolonio Vadil, Tomasa, was baptized on October 10, 1887.

More migrants came and settled along the Apean (Apayan) River from Puongan upstream and occupied the western part of the barrio now called Riverside East and Riverside West. The settlers found the place always flowing with abundant water coming from a spring in the eastern part of the barrio, and so they called the place "Nabasa" which means "wet" in Iloko language. It was later officially called "Mabasa" changing from the old name of "San Roque."

Inaban
The name came from the Iloko word INABAAN which means a place where there are plenty of GABI (common name) plants. Locally known as “ABA”.  In the early days, giant gabi plants with leaves as big as umbrellas thrived in the vicinity of this barangay.

A story goes that many years ago when the place was still thickly covered with flora and fauna,  and was a favorite hunting ground, a hunter once hit a big male deer with his spear.  However, the deer was not mortally wounded and it decided to attack the hunter.

The man and the deer fought for about an hour but in the end, the man triumphed over the animal but the hunter was seriously wounded.  Alone,  he tried to find his way home.  But then it began to rain, he sought shelter under the big leaves of the giant gabi plants.
Unfortunately, the hunter died because of his wounds and days after, his remains were found under the giant gabi plants.
During the arrival of the American soldiers in World War II, they simply speak and pronounce the word, INABAAN into INABAN.  Traditionally,  the word INABAAN metamorphosed into INABAN.
As years went by, INABAN was created in 1963 as a barangay of Dupax (now DUPAX DEL NORTE) by virtue of Republic Act No. 3590.

Climate

Demographics

In the 2020 census, Dupax del Norte had a population of 33,295.

Economy

Government
Dupax del Norte, belonging to the lone congressional district of the province of Nueva Vizcaya, is governed by a mayor designated as its local chief executive and by a municipal council as its legislative body in accordance with the Local Government Code. The mayor, vice mayor, and the councilors are elected directly by the people through an election which is being held every three years.

Elected officials

Education
The Schools Division of Nueva Vizcaya governs the town's public education system. The division office is a field office of the DepEd in Cagayan Valley region. The office governs the public and private elementary and public and private high schools throughout the municipality.

Notable personalities

 Carlos Padilla, a Filipino politician who currently serves as governor of Nueva Vizcaya.

Sister cities
 San Pedro, Laguna

References

External links

[ Philippine Standard Geographic Code]
Philippine Census Information
Local Governance Performance Management System
RA 6372 - Creating the Municipality of Dupax del Sur
PD 586 - Amending RA 6372, inserting new sections

Municipalities of Nueva Vizcaya